World Trade Center is a 2006 American docudrama disaster film directed by Oliver Stone and written by Andrea Berloff, based on the experience of a few police officers during the September 11 attacks, in which they were trapped in the rubble of the collapsed World Trade Center. It stars Nicolas Cage, Maria Bello, Michael Peña, Maggie Gyllenhaal, Stephen Dorff, and Michael Shannon. The film was shot between October 2005 and February 2006, and theatrically released in the United States by Paramount Pictures on August 9, 2006. It was met with generally positive reviews from critics and grossed $163 million worldwide.

Plot

On September 11, 2001, members of the Port Authority Police are dispatched to Downtown Manhattan in response to the North Tower of the World Trade Center having been hit by a plane. The officers learn en route that the South Tower also was hit by another plane. Sergeant John McLoughlin, veteran of the 1993 bombing, assembles a group of volunteers; officers Antonio Rodrigues, Will Jimeno and Dominick Pezzulo, to retrieve rescue equipment from Building 5. They are joined by Officer Christopher Amoroso.

As the five officers prepare to enter the North Tower from the concourse, the South Tower begins to collapse onto them, and McLoughlin realizes that their only chance of survival is to take shelter in the elevator shaft. McLoughlin, Jimeno, and Pezzulo are the only survivors, but they are trapped beneath the rubble. Pezzulo tries but fails to free Jimeno, whose lower half is pinned. McLoughlin, who is also pinned, listens helplessly as the North Tower begins to collapse. Pezzulo is fatally injured when a concrete slab crushes his torso, but manages to fire his sidearm once into the air, in an attempt to alert rescuers to their whereabouts just before dying. Jimeno and McLoughlin spend painful, terrifying hours under the rubble telling each other about their lives. Meanwhile, their families try to learn if they are still alive.

When Building 7 collapses, both men scream and accept their demise, but they survive without further harm. McLoughlin tries to keep Jimeno awake by encouraging him to repeatedly pull on a metal pipe that potential rescuers might hear. Hours pass, and McLoughlin falls in and out of consciousness. Both agree to stay alive for one another.

Two United States Marines, Dave Karnes and Jason Thomas, who are searching for survivors, hear the noise produced by Jimeno and find the men, calling for help to dig them out. After hours and effort by first responders, Jimeno is rescued first, and then hours later McLoughlin is lifted out of the debris in critical condition. Both men are reunited with their families at the hospital and undergo medical treatment, including extensive surgeries, and McLoughlin is placed in a medically induced coma.

In 2003, Jimeno and McLoughlin, both medically retired from duty, attend a celebratory barbecue with their families. The epilogue reveals that both men were two of twenty people found alive at Ground Zero, and they were numbers eighteen and nineteen, respectively. David Karnes reenlisted in the Marines and served two tours in the Iraq War.

Cast

 Nicolas Cage as Sergeant John McLoughlin
 Michael Peña as Officer Will Jimeno
 Maria Bello as Donna McLoughlin
 Maggie Gyllenhaal as Allison Jimeno
 Stephen Dorff as NYPD ESU Rescueman Scott Strauss
 Jon Bernthal as Officer Christopher Amoroso
 Jay Hernandez as Officer Dominick Pezzulo
 Michael Shannon as Marine Sergeant Dave Karnes
 Donna Murphy as Judy Jonas
 Brad William Henke as Allison's Brother
 Peter McRobbie as Allison's Father
 Frank Whaley as Paramedic Chuck Sereika
 Jude Ciccolella as Inspector Lawrence Fields
 Nicholas Turturro as Officer Colovito
 Danny Nucci as Officer Giraldi
 William Mapother as Marine Sergeant Jason Thomas
Tom Wright as Officer Reynolds
 Wass Stevens as Officer Pat McLoughlin
 Armando Riesco as Officer Antonio Rodrigues
 Ned Eisenberg as Officer Polnicki
 Dara Coleman as Officer Boel
 Nick Damici as Lieutenant John Kassimatis
 Arthur Nascarella as FDNY Chief At Ground Zero
 Patti D'Arbanville as Donna's Friend
 Viola Davis as Mother In Hospital
 Will Jimeno as Port Authority Police Officer
 Aimee Mullins as Reporter
 Charles A. Gargano as Port Authority Police Commander

Production

Historical accuracy
The Port Authority police officers portrayed by Cage and Peña, John McLoughlin and Will Jimeno, and their wives, played by Bello and Gyllenhaal, were involved with the writing and overall production. McLoughlin and Jimeno said they wanted to have a film made to honor their rescuers and comrades who died on September 11, not for personal gain.

McLoughlin's wife Donna has said: "We got involved because we felt it needed to be done accurately. We wanted to do the right thing and I think the filmmakers wanted to do the right thing too." Both John McLoughlin and Will Jimeno appear at the end of the film during the barbecue scene.

The real ESU (Emergency Services Unit) police from New York who are depicted in the film—Scott Strauss and Paddy McGee—were on set as technical advisers. In addition, the firemen in the film were played by real FDNY members who served on 9/11. All of them enthusiastically supported the film and its intention to accurately portray the rescue of McLoughlin and Jimeno.

Jeanette Pezzulo, the widow of Port Authority police officer Dominick Pezzulo (who died in the attacks and is played by Jay Hernandez in the film), expressed anger with the film, criticizing McLoughlin's and Jimeno's participation in its production. She is quoted as saying, "My thing is: this man died for you. How do you do this to his family?" Staten Island resident Jamie Amoroso, whose husband also died during the rescue operation, also expressed her anger over the film and said she did "not need a movie" to tell her "what a hero" her husband was.

Many major American newspapers ran editorials accusing Stone of having his film examine 9/11 conspiracy theories because Stone was known for examining various conspiracy theories surrounding the Kennedy assassination in JFK. However, Stone has stated that the film does not explore the conspiracy theories surrounding 9/11. He, the producers, and the real McLoughlin and Jimeno, have said the film is a simple dedication to the heroism and sadness of the day with little-to-no political themes.

The film has been accused of not providing a fair portrayal of the character and motives of rescuer Dave Karnes and paramedic Chuck Sereika. They did not participate in the making of the film and felt their roles of being the first rescuers to reach the trapped men did not receive enough screen time. Sereika began treating and extricating Jimeno a full 20 minutes before officers from the New York City Police Department's Emergency Services Unit arrived.

Certain details about the story were altered. For instance, the film depicts McLoughlin’s team being completely oblivious to the crash into the South Tower, having arrived at the World Trade Center site and entered the concourse before United Airlines Flight 175 struck; in reality, Will Jimeno has clarified in interviews that they were well aware of the second impact as it occurred while they were en-route to the complex.

Non-fictional characters
John McLoughlin graduated from the State University of New York at Oswego, where he was a member of the Sigma Tau Chi fraternity. He was rescued after 22 hours, the 19th of 20 people pulled out of the rubble alive. Doctors kept him in an induced coma for six weeks. He underwent 27 surgeries and spent nearly three months in the hospital and rehabilitation. Four months after their rescue, McLoughlin and Jimeno—who both have since retired—took part in a ceremony at Ground Zero to watch as the final column was removed. When all the uniformed officers walked out of The Pit, the last two were McLoughlin and Jimeno. On June 11, 2002, McLoughlin received the Port Authority's Medal of Honor. He resided in Goshen, New York.

Will Jimeno was born on November 26, 1967, in Colombia but immigrated to New York City as a boy with his family. At the time of the attacks, he was a rookie cop assigned to the Port Authority Bus Terminal. He was pulled out of the rubble after 13 hours, the 18th of 20 people pulled out alive. On June 11, 2002, Jimeno received the Port Authority's Medal of Honor. Jimeno and McLoughlin make a cameo in the film.

Christopher Amoroso was born on June 1, 1972, and raised in North Bergen, New Jersey where he attended North Bergen High School. Since 2010 the Chopper 2002 Foundation has presented their annual invitational softball tournament in North Bergen on the first weekend of June.

Dominick Pezzulo was born on August 15, 1965, in Italy to Dino and Victoria Pezzulo. He was named after his grandfather Domenico Pezzulo. Pezzulo taught auto repair, math and computer technology. After seven years as a teacher, Pezzulo became a police officer for the Port Authority of New York and New Jersey Police Department 13 months before the attack. He was stationed at the Port Authority Bus Terminal. On September 9, 2005, all of the public safety officers killed on September 11, 2001, were posthumously awarded the 9/11 Heroes Medal of Valor by President George W. Bush. At the National 9/11 Memorial, Pezzulo is memorialized at the South Pool, on Panel S-29. In his birthplace of Giano Vetusto, Italy, a plaque has been erected on the door of the house he grew up in.

Bruce A. Reynolds was born in Inwood and resided in Knowlton Township, New Jersey with his wife and two kids. He joined the Port Authority in 1986 and was stationed at the bus terminal on 42nd Street. On September 11th, 2001 - Reynolds was sent to the World Trade Center from his post at the George Washington Bridge. Despite having respiratory problems, he went into the South Tower to help with the rescue effort.

David W. Karnes was born  and spent 23 years in the Marine Corps infantry. He left his accounting office at Deloitte and Touche in Wilton, Connecticut on September 11, 2001 soon after witnessing the attacks on television to assist in the rescue efforts. Karnes spent nine days at the site before returning to his office. He then reenlisted in the Marine Corps Reserve and went on to serve in the Philippines and Iraq. He served for 17 months, including two tours of duty in Iraq. Karnes did not cooperate in the making of Stone's World Trade Center movie due to Stone's antipathy towards U.S. President George W. Bush. Some critics took issue with the portrayal in the film. Rebecca Liss of Slate magazine observed, "The film seems to overplay his zeal without conveying his motivations and reasoning." It notes he is unfairly portrayed as "a robotic soldier of Christ—a little wacky and simplistic."

Jason Thomas was born  and was dropping his daughter off at the home of his mother on Long Island when she told him about the attacks. Despite having left active duty in August 2001, Thomas drove to Manhattan to assist in the rescue efforts, telling the Associated Press: "Someone needed help. It didn't matter who. I didn't even have a plan. But I have all this training as a Marine, and all I could think was, 'My city is in need.'" As of 2013, Thomas is serving in the United States Air Force as a medical technician. His portrayal by a white actor in the film generated controversy, although the producers claimed that they were unaware that the real Thomas was black until they had already started filming. On February 11, 2007, Extreme Makeover: Home Edition aired a special two-hour episode about Thomas and his family. Following the attacks, Thomas and his wife had moved their four children from New York to Columbus, Ohio. The house they bought began to deteriorate and the show intervened to help them. On September 2, 2013, Channel 4 broadcast The Lost Hero of 9/11 which detailed Thomas's involvement in the rescue operation following the collapse of both towers. As of 2018, Thomas was living in Columbus with his wife Kirsti and their children. He worked as an officer for the Ohio Supreme Court. Thomas is in 15 Septembers Later which has appeared on the History Channel.

Reception

Box office
In its opening weekend, the film made $18.7 million in the U.S. and Canada. In total, the film grossed $70.3 million in North America, and $93 million in other territories, for a worldwide total of $163.2 million.

Critical response  
On Rotten Tomatoes the film holds an approval rating of 66% based on 234 reviews, and an average rating of 6.70/10. The website's critics consensus states: "As a visually stunning tribute to lives lost in tragedy, World Trade Center succeeds unequivocally, and it is more politically muted than many of Stone's other works." On Metacritic, the film has a weighted average score of 66 out of 100, based on 40 critics, indicating "generally favorable reviews". Audiences polled by CinemaScore gave the film an average grade of "A−" on an A+ to F scale.

The producers met with all relevant September 11 victims groups, before production began, to inform them of the intent. After its release, they, the NYPD, and the FDNY were very pleased with it. Former mayor Rudy Giuliani, former Governor George Pataki, and then-Fire Commissioner Nicholas Scoppetta, as well as representatives from the NY Port Authority, were at the premiere of the film at the Ziegfeld Theatre in Manhattan.

Home media

The film was released on DVD and HD DVD on December 12, 2006, and on Blu-ray on June 3, 2008.

See also
 List of cultural references to the September 11 attacks
 Collapse of the World Trade Center
 United 93, another 2006 film, directed by Paul Greengrass, which centered around the events aboard United Airlines Flight 93.
 List of firefighting films
 Whitewashing in film

Notes

References
 World Trade Center official site 
 Article in truTV Crime Library 
 Craig Armstrong – Movie Score Composer
 'World Trade Center' Movie Leaves Real Heroes Awestruck 
 September 11th Remembered 
 Images from the film 
 Tribute to Will Jimeno

External links

 
 
 
 
 
 Interview with Oliver Stone & the cast of World Trade Center

2006 films
2000s disaster films
2006 drama films
Paramount Pictures films
American disaster films
American docudrama films
Films based on the September 11 attacks
Drama films based on actual events
Films set in New York City
Films directed by Oliver Stone
Films with screenplays by Andrea Berloff
Films shot in New York (state)
Films shot in New Jersey
Films about firefighting
Clifton, New Jersey
World Trade Center
Films scored by Craig Armstrong (composer)
Films produced by Debra Hill
Cultural depictions of George W. Bush
Films set in 2001
2000s English-language films
2000s American films